Ommatophora is a genus of moths in the family Erebidae.

Species
Ommatophora burrowsi Prout, 1922
Ommatophora fulvastra Guenee, 1852
Ommatophora luminosa (Cramer, 1780)

References
Natural History Museum Lepidoptera genus database

Ommatophorini
Moth genera